Grand Challenges Canada (GCC) is a Canadian nonprofit organization that uses a Grand Challenges model to fund solutions to critical health and development challenges in the developing world.

The organization has supported over 1,000 projects in more than 80 countries, impacting 1.3 million people. Conservative statistical projections suggest its activities will save up to 1.6 million lives and improve up to 42 million lives by 2030.

It is funded primarily by the Government of Canada and hosted in the MaRS Discovery District by the University Health Network in Toronto, Ontario, Canada.

History 

Grand Challenges Canada was based on the Grand Challenges in Global Health model of the Bill & Melinda Gates Foundation. Peter A. Singer, CEO of Grand Challenges Canada, and Dr. Abdallah Daar, Chair of Grand Challenges Canada’s Scientific Advisory Board, sat on the scientific board.

In 2007, Singer wrote an op-ed in the National Post that made the argument for a parallel organization based in Canada. This drew the attention of the Canadian government, leading to the creation of Grand Challenges Canada.

The organization was founded with CAD$225 million over 5 years from the 2008 Canadian federal budget to "support breakthrough research that addresses critical global health problems to bring lasting improvements to the health and lives of people in low-income countries." The 2008 Budget created the Development Innovation Fund, managed by a consortium comprising Grand Challenges Canada, the Canadian Institutes of Health Research, and the International Development Research Centre.

In June 2015, Global Affairs Canada announced an additional CAD$161 million in funding for the organization over 10 years through the government's Muskoka Initiative on Maternal, Newborn and Child Health.

Innovations supported by Grand Challenges Canada include the Odon device, the Lucky iron fish, the Ovillanta, a Doppler fetal monitor that operates without electricity, a cheap and functional artificial knee joint, a sterile cover for hardware-store drills that transforms them into surgical instruments, a flocked swab to improve diarrhea diagnosis, a $5 safe birth toolkit, a 3-D printed, low-cost prosthetic hand, and a self-propelled powder to stop bleeding.

Programs 

Grand Challenges Canada supports a number of global health programs and initiatives:

"Stars in Global Health", which provides seed funding for solutions to global health problems. Recipients of this award include Evelyn Gitau.
"Saving Lives at Birth", which identifies and scales up prevention and treatment approaches for pregnant women and newborns around the time of birth. Saving Lives at Birth is a partnership of the United States Agency for International Development (USAID), the Government of Norway, the Bill & Melinda Gates Foundation, Grand Challenges Canada, the United Kingdom Department for International Development (DFID), and the Korea International Cooperation Agency (KOICA).
"Saving Brains", which supports protecting and nurturing early brain development to provide a long-term exit strategy from poverty. Saving Brains is a partnership of Grand Challenges Canada, Aga Khan Foundation Canada, Bernard van Leer Foundation, Bill & Melinda Gates Foundation, The ELMA Foundation, Grand Challenges Ethiopia, Maria Cecilia Souto Vidigal Foundation, Palix Foundation, UBS Optimus Foundation and World Vision Canada. 
"Global Mental Health", which supports models to expand the access to care and effectiveness of services to improve mental health. Through Grand Challenges Canada's Global Mental Health program, the Government of Canada is funding the world's largest body of global mental health research projects.  
"Transition To Scale", which brings innovations from the proof-of-concept stage to scale using venture philanthropy and impact investing models. The program supports ideas that achieved proof of concept through Grand Challenges Canada's pipeline or through the pipeline of its partners, such as the Skoll Foundation and the Bill & Melinda Gates Foundation.
Grand Challenges Canada is an anchor investor in the Global Health Investment Fund, a US$108 million fund that allows investors to finance late-stage global health technologies. Other investors and partners include the Bill & Melinda Gates Foundation, JPMorgan Chase, the Swedish International Development Cooperation Agency, the International Finance Corporation, GlaxoSmithKline, Merck, Pfizer, the German Federal Ministry of Economic Cooperation and Development, the Children's Investment Fund Foundation, AXA, and Storebrand.
Grand Challenges Canada hosts the Every Woman Every Child (EWEC) Innovation Marketplace, launched in September 2015 under the United Nations Every Woman Every Child movement and the Global Strategy for Women's and Children's Health. The Marketplace brokers transition to scale investments in reproductive, maternal, newborn, child and adolescent health.
Grand Challenges Canada launched Creating Hope in Conflict: A Humanitarian Grand Challenge in February 2018 with funding from USAID's Office of U.S. Foreign Disaster Assistance (OFDA), the United Kingdom's Department for International Development (DFID), and the Netherlands Ministry of Foreign Affairs. The Humanitarian Grand Challenge seeks to fund innovations that address those most affected by armed conflict or humanitarian crises. The first grand challenge identified 23 finalists for awards up to USD$250,000 each.

Governance 
Grand Challenges Canada is governed by a Board of Directors and is guided by a Scientific Advisory Board.

References

External links 
 Official website
 Global Grand Challenges website
 Saving Brains program website
 Saving Lives at Birth program website 

Development charities based in Canada
Non-profit organizations based in Toronto
Organizations established in 2010
International medical and health organizations
Health charities in Canada
2010 establishments in Canada